Paul Laurence Dunbar High School is a comprehensive high school in the Stop Six neighborhood of Fort Worth, Texas, United States. Named for the dialectical poet Paul Laurence Dunbar, the school strives to educate the majority African-American community it serves.

History
Formal education in the Stop Six area was established in 1907 with the Rustville School, which joined the Fort Worth Public School System in 1924. The school changed its name to Paul Laurence Dunbar School in 1938 and began adding high school classes in 1953, graduating its first class in 1957.

From 1973 to 2005, Dunbar High School's boys basketball team was coached by Robert Hughes, the winningest boys high school basketball coach in US sports and Naismith Memorial Basketball Hall of Fame inductee.

Campus
The current Dunbar High School building was completed in 1967 for $2.1 million.

Dunbar High School houses an Aviation Engineering, Aviation Technology, and Entrepreneur and Urban Development academic programs.

Athletics
The Dunbar Wildcats actively compete in the following sports in the UIL:
Boys Basketball - The boys basketball program has won three state championships (1993, 2003, 2006)
Girls Basketball - The girls basketball program has won two state championships (2005 and 2007)
Boys and Girls Track & Field - The boys program won one state title (1974) and the girls program won one state title (1991)
Football
Baseball
Girls Volleyball
Softball
Wrestling
Soccer

Notable alumni
Julio Cedillo, film and television actor
Gary Collier, former professional basketball player
Charles Smith, professional basketball player
Saikat Chakrabarti, political activist

References

External links

Dunbar High School

Educational institutions established in 1953
Public high schools in Fort Worth, Texas
Fort Worth Independent School District high schools
Magnet schools in Texas
1953 establishments in Texas